Janusz Majewski (born 29 January 1940) is a Polish fencer. He competed in the individual and team sabre events at the 1972 Summer Olympics.

References

1940 births
Living people
Polish male fencers
Olympic fencers of Poland
Fencers at the 1972 Summer Olympics
People from Mława County
Sportspeople from Masovian Voivodeship
20th-century Polish people
21st-century Polish people